Girls' Town is a 1942 American drama film directed by Victor Halperin and starring Edith Fellows, June Storey and Alice White.

The winner of a Midwest beauty contest receives a screen test in Hollywood and takes her sister along, lodging in a boarding house.

Cast
 Edith Fellows as Sue Norman
 June Storey as Myra Norman
 Kenneth Howell as Kenny Lane
 Alice White as Nicky
 Anna Q. Nilsson as Mother Lorraine
 Warren Hymer as Joe
 Vince Barnett as Dimitri
 Paul Dubov as Lionel Fontaine
 Peggy Ryan as Penny
 Helene Stanley as Sally
 Helen McCloud as Mayor
 Cara Williams as Ethel 
 Charles Williams as Coffer

References

Bibliography
 Fetrow, Alan G. Feature Films, 1940-1949: a United States Filmography. McFarland, 1994.

External links
 

1942 films
1942 drama films
American drama films
Films directed by Victor Halperin
American black-and-white films
Producers Releasing Corporation films
1940s English-language films
1940s American films